The 1916 Harvard Crimson football team represented Harvard University in the 1916 college football season. The Crimson finished with a 7–3 record under ninth-year head coach Percy Haughton.  Walter Camp selected only one Harvard player, guard Harrie Dadmun, as a first-team member of his 1916 College Football All-America Team.

Schedule

References

Harvard
Harvard Crimson football seasons
Harvard Crimson football
1910s in Boston